DreamWorks may refer to:

 DreamWorks Pictures, an American film production company of Amblin 
 DreamWorks Television, an American television production company and division of the film studio
 DreamWorks Records, an American record label and former division of the film studio later acquired by Universal Music Group
 DreamWorks Animation, an American animation studio and former division of the film studio that is now a subsidiary of NBCUniversal
 DreamWorks Animation Television, an American television animation studio, production company, and the arm and label of DreamWorks Animation
 DreamWorks Classics, a subsidiary of the animation studio and formerly known as Classic Media
 DreamWorks Experience, a themed land at the Dreamworld theme park in Australia
 DreamWorks Interactive, a video game production arm later acquired by Electronic Arts

See also
 Dreamwork, a method of dream analysis
 Dreamwork (song), a song by AKA